Oktyabrsky is a rural locality (a settlement) and the administrative center of Oktyabrskoye Rural Settlement, Olkhovsky District, Volgograd Oblast, Russia. The population was 751 as of 2010. There are 12 streets.

Geography 
Oktyabrsky is located in steppe, on the Volga Upland, 28 km south of Olkhovka (the district's administrative centre) by road. Zenzevatka is the nearest rural locality.

References 

Rural localities in Olkhovsky District